The United States Chamber of Commerce (USCC) is the largest lobbying group in the United States.  The group was founded in April 1912 out of local chambers of commerce at the urging of President William Howard Taft and his Secretary of Commerce and Labor Charles Nagel. It was Taft's belief that the "government needed to deal with a group that could speak with authority for the interests of business".

The U.S. Chamber of Commerce claims to represent 3 million businesses and organizations but this claim is often contested.  

The current president and CEO of the Chamber is Suzanne P. Clark. She previously worked in the Chamber from 1997 to 2007, and returned in 2014, holding multiple executive roles before being named the organization's first female CEO in February 2021.

History

The U.S. Chamber of Commerce was founded at a meeting of delegates on April 22, 1912. An important catalyst for the creation of the U.S. Chamber of Commerce were two prior business engagements between the U.S. and Japan. In 1908, Eiichi Shibusawa invited the first official, modern day U.S. business delegation to visit Japan. This delegation was led by the prominent banker/economist Frank A. Vanderlip accompanied by sixty business representatives from the West coast states of California, Oregon, and Washington. The goal was to bridge their nations diplomatically and to promote increased business and commerce.

In 1909, in appreciation for the hospitality shown to the 1908 Vanderlip business delegation during their visit to Japan, an invitation was now sent to Japanese business leaders to tour the U.S. This invitation came from the Associated Chambers of Commerce of the Pacific Coast, whose membership included eight principal cities from  western coastal states of California, Oregon and Washington. Their invitation was accepted by the Japanese, and in 1909, Shibusawa, accompanied by his delegation of over fifty of Japan's most prominent business leaders and notables spent three months visiting 53 cities across America.

Their travels were highlighted in many newspapers as they journeyed in a specially outfitted ‘Million Dollar Train,’ provided by the American industrial community. The U.S. government recognized the significance of their visit and sent U.S. representatives to accompany and assist them during their trip. Six representatives of the Associated Chambers of Commerce of the Pacific Coast also accompanied them, to help facilitate the events along the way.

Their meetings included many chambers of commerce, tours of factories, power plants, fire departments, port facilities, mines, farms, schools, universities, libraries, theaters, churches, hospitals, and many other facilities. Their main goals to develop friendship and familiarity between the two nations while encouraging bilateral trade and commerce. An important influence of their visit was that it connected chambers of commerce across U.S., which likely motivated them to recognize the benefits of becoming a national organization. President Taft was one of the U.S. leaders that Shibusawa and his delegates met with during their visit.

The Chamber was created by President Taft as a counterbalance to the labor movement of the time. John H. Fahey was the first chairman, and Henry A. Wheeler was the first president and Elliot Hersey Goodwin was the first secretary. It opened its first office in the Evans Building. In 1913, President Taft spoke at its first banquet at the Willard Hotel, where he called for the organization to lobby for comprehensive currency legislation and to support the Commission on Economy and Efficiency. During its first year in existence, the U.S. Chamber of Commerce's membership consisted of 297 commercial organizations and 165,000 firms and individuals. The U.S. Chamber's staff grew drastically in just ten years of being created.  In 1912, there were only four employees.  However, by the time 1921 came along, the number of employees had risen to three hundred

During the 1919 U.S. Chamber board meeting, Henry A. Wheeler proposed an idea that surprised many in the Chamber itself.  The idea was to create a national headquarters.  Wheeler stated during this proposal that the Board of Directors should take this vote very seriously in deciding whether or not to make a national headquarters due to having to pay for it with their own money.  Nevertheless, the Board of Directors didn't hesitate with their answer and they began the process to create the headquarters.  Wheeler and Edson already had a planned location for where they believed the headquarters should be.  The location was facing the White House on the corner of Lafayette Square.  The only thing that was stopping them from building were two 19th-century mansions: the Corcoran House and the Slidell house.  Nevertheless, the mansions were purchased for $775,000.

The Washington, D.C., headquarters of the U.S. Chamber of Commerce occupies land that was formerly the home of Daniel Webster.

Promoting business

Throughout its history, the United States Chamber of Commerce promoted the nation's business and economy.   The Chamber's  first referendum in January 1913 called for the planning of a National Budget.  This calling for a National Budget created The Budget and Accounting Act of 1921.  From there, the Chamber worked to aid the U.S. Government during both World Wars and through the Great Depression.  During the 1960s, the Chamber thought of the business community in a different way.  They didn't have a World War to fight, however, a war against crime and poverty.

During the oil crisis of 1973, the Chamber pushed for expanding domestic production.  This entailed oil and gas exploration, as well as coal mining, and the Trans Alaska Pipeline.  In 1981, the Chamber launched the Let's Rebuild America campaign to help support President Reagan's Economic Recovery and Tax Act.  With increased globalization in the 1990s, the Chamber promoted expanding opportunities for the export of American goods and services in hopes of creating jobs for Americans.

Although various chambers of commerce can work with all levels of government, they tend to concentrate their efforts on specific levels: Local chambers of commerce tend to focus on local issues, state chambers on state issues, and the U.S. Chamber of Commerce focuses on national issues at the federal government level.  They also work closely with a number of youth organizations in the country about the value and role of business in our society today.

In 1993, the Chamber lost several members over its support for Clinton's healthcare reform efforts.  The Chamber had chosen to support healthcare reform at that time due to the spiraling healthcare costs experienced by its members.  However, House Republicans retaliated by urging boycotts of the organization. By the time health care reform became a major issue again in 2010–2012, the organization opposed such efforts.

Though the Chamber claims to represent over 3 million American businesses, according to data 94% of its income comes from about 1500 big businesses.

In late 2011 it was revealed that the Chamber's computer system was breached from November 2009 to May 2010 by Chinese hackers.  The purpose of the breach appeared to be gain information related to the Chamber's lobbying regarding Asian trade policy.

Since a 1971 internal memo by Lewis Powell advocating a more active role in cases before United States Supreme Court, the Chamber has found increasing success in litigation.  Under the Burger and Rehnquist Courts the Chamber was on the prevailing side 43% and 56% of the time, respectively, but under the Roberts Court, the Chamber's success rate rose to 68% as of June 21, 2012.

In the 2008 election cycle, aggressive ads paid for by the USCC attacked a number of Democratic congressional candidates (such as Minnesota's DFL Senate candidate Al Franken) and supported a number of Republican candidates including John Sununu, Gordon Smith, Roger Wicker, Saxby Chambliss and Elizabeth Dole.

The Chamber of Commerce was an opponent of the Obama administration during Barack Obama's eight years in power.

During the 2010 campaign cycle, the Chamber spent $32 million, 93 percent of which was to help Republican candidates. The Chamber's spending out of its general funds was criticized as illegal under campaign finance laws. In a front-page article titled "Large Donations Aid U.S. Chamber in Election Drive", The New York Times reported that the Chamber used contributions in campaigns without separating foreign and domestic contributions, which if true would appear to contravene prohibitions on lobbying by foreign nations and groups.  In question was the Chamber's international branches, "AmChams", whose funds are unaccounted for and perhaps mix into the general collection. All branches, corporations, and members of the Chamber pay dues; the question is how they divide the money for expenses in national campaigns.

The truth of these allegations is unknown. The Chamber has refused to provide any concrete evidence to refute the allegations. In reference to the matter, Tom Donohue wrote his council and members on October 12, 2010. He stated, "Let me be clear. The Chamber does not use any foreign money to fund voter education activities—period. We have strict financial controls in place to ensure this. The funds we receive from American Chambers of Commerce abroad, bilateral business councils, and non-U.S.-based global companies represent a small fraction of our more than $200 million annual revenues. Under our accounting system, these revenues are never used to support any political activities. We are in full compliance with all laws and regulations." Organizations Moveon.org, Think Progress, and People for the American Way rallied against the Chamber at the Justice Department to start an injunction for a criminal investigation. The Chamber is not required to produce fundraising records.

President Barack Obama asked the IRS and Federal Elections Commission to ensure that the foreign funds that the Chamber receives are not used for political activities. Obama criticized the Chamber for not disclosing its contributors. The Chamber has responded that "No foreign money is used to fund political activities."   After the election, the Chamber reiterated the nature of Obama's policy dictated action from the Chamber, however the conflict would not be made "personal".

Despite more than $33 million spent supporting candidates in the 2012 Congressional races, Chamber-backed candidates lost 36 out of the 50 elections in which the Chamber participated.

In late 2013 the Chamber announced it would distribute campaign contributions in "tens" of Republican primary elections to oppose the Tea Party movement and create a "more governable Republican party." In early 2014 Tom Donohue clarified that the push would be to elect "pro-business" members of Congress "who favor trade, energy development and immigration reform". During Donohue's tenure as head of the Chamber of Commerce, the Chamber formed an alliance with the Republican Party. Donohue retired in February 2021.

In recent years, as Republicans have backed more trade restrictions and staunch anti-immigration policies and more Democrats have embraced immigration, free trade, and other pro-business policies, the composition of the Chamber's political support has shifted. In 2019, the Chamber updated the formula for its scorecard used to determine endorsements, to "more fully reward members of Congress for helping to advance pro-business policies, while simultaneously encouraging members to reach the compromises necessary for effective governing."

After Donald Trump refused to concede following the 2020 presidential election, and most Republican members of Congress supported attempts to overturn the election results based on false claims of fraud, the Chamber of Commerce released a memo to its members, stating it would "review the totality of actions of its members" and "take into consideration... future conduct that erodes our democratic institutions".

In 2021, Chamber lobbyist Neil Bradley said there would be a "political price" to pay for any lawmakers who supported the PRO Act, which the Chamber called a "litany of almost every failed idea from the past 30 years of labor policy."

Thomas J. Donohue led the U.S. Chamber from 1997 to 2021.

Positions taken
Politically, the US Chamber of Commerce is considered to be on the political right, but is known to take positions that many Republicans, particularly populists, do not support. The US Chamber is often associated with the establishment wing of the Republican Party.

Legislation
 Campaigned against portions of the Sarbanes–Oxley Act. (Introduced 02/14/2002) (07/30/2002 Became Public Law)
 Supported the SAFETY Act. (Passed 2002)
 Supported the American Recovery and Reinvestment Act of 2009. (Introduced 01/26/2009) (02/17/2009 Became Public Law)
 Supported the Food Safety Modernization Act. (Introduced 03/03/2009)
 In April 2009, the Chamber began an ad campaign against the proposed Employee Free Choice Act. Critics such as the National Association of Manufacturers have contended that additional use of card check elections will lead to overt coercion on the part of union organizers. Opponents of the Employee Free Choice Act also claim, referring to perceived lack of access to a secret ballot, that the measure would not protect employee privacy. For this reason the Chamber argued the act would reduce workers' rights.
 Opposed the American Clean Energy and Security Act climate change bill. (Introduced 05/15/2009)   "[H]elped kill several attempts to pass climate-change legislation" between 1997 and 2010, but did not oppose efforts by Senators Kerry, Graham, and Lieberman in 2010.
 In November 2009, the Chamber was reported to be seeking to spend $50,000 to hire a "respected economist" to produce a study that could be used to portray health-care legislation as a job killer and threat to the nation's economy.
 The Chamber views some reform as necessary, but opposed the Dodd/Frank legislation that was passed, asserting that it would damage loan availability. (Introduced 12/02/2009) (07/21/2010 Became Public Law) 
 Supported the Stop Online Piracy Act (SOPA). (Introduced in House (10/26/2011)
 Supported the Jobs Act of 2012. (Introduced 12/08/2011) (04/05/2012 Became Public Law)
 Supported the Workforce Innovation and Opportunity Act. (Introduced 02/25/2013) (07/22/2014 Became Public Law)
 Supported the Electronic Communications Privacy Act. (Introduced 02/04/2015)
 Actively lobbies against anti-tobacco policies implemented in other countries. In particular, it opposes attempts to carve out tobacco from the Investor-state dispute settlement mechanism negotiated under the Trans-Pacific Partnership agreement. (Signed 4 February 2016)
 Supported the Ozone Implementation Act of 2017 (Introduced 02/01/2017)
 Supported the Furthering Asbestos Claim Transparency Act. (Introduced 02/07/2017)
 Supported the Fairness in Class Action Litigation Act. (Introduced 02/09/2017)
 Supported the SAFE Act. (Introduced 03/16/2017)
 Opposed the American Health Care Act of 2017. (Introduced 03/20/2017)
 Opposed the Clean Power Plan. (added new bullet point) (On March 28, 2017)
 Supported the Reauthorization Act. (Introduced 04/25/2017)
 Supported the Self Drive Act. (Introduced 07/25/2017)
 Supported the Tribal Tax and Investment Reform Act of 2017. (Introduced 10/05/2017)
 Opposes the DISCLOSE Act, which aims to limit foreign influence on U.S. elections. (House - 06/27/2018)
 Opposed to using the government shutdown and debt ceiling limit as negotiating tactics.
 Support for business globalization, free trade, and offshoring.
 Qualified opposition to financial regulation.

Court cases
 Argued against mandatory immigration status checks by employers in Arizona including in a Supreme Court case.
 Filed an amicus brief to the U.S. Supreme Court in Citizens United v FEC to urge the court to overrule Austin and restore "free corporate speech." Its position is opposed by some advocates for independent businesses.

Climate change 
Until 2019, the U.S. Chamber rejected the scientific consensus on climate change. Historically, the organization has promoted the work of climate change deniers and sought to stymie efforts to combat climate change. In 2019, the organization acknowledged that humans contribute to climate change.

The Chamber's senior vice president for environment, technology, and regulatory affairs William L. Kovacs threatened to sue the Environmental Protection Agency in order to have what he termed "the Scopes monkey trial of the 21st century" on climate science before any federal climate regulation was passed in October 2009.  Chamber CEO Tom Donohue disavowed the comment, but the Chamber strongly opposed the American Clean Energy and Security Act. In response to this position, several companies quit the Chamber, including Exelon Corp, PG&E Corp, PNM Resources, and Apple Inc. Nike, Inc resigned from their board of directors position, but continued their membership. Nike stated that they believe they can better influence the policy by being part of the conversation.

Peter Darbee, CEO of former chamber member PG&E (a natural gas and electric utility company in California), said, "We find it dismaying that the Chamber neglects the indisputable fact that a decisive majority of experts have said the data on global warming are compelling... In our view, an intellectually honest argument over the best policy response to the challenges of climate change is one thing; disingenuous attempts to diminish or distort the reality of these challenges are quite another." In response to an online campaign of Prius owners organized by Moveon.org, Toyota stated that it would not leave the Chamber. The Aspen Chamber Resort Association of Aspen, Colorado left the U.S. Chamber because of its views on climate change, in light of how climate change could hurt Aspen's winter tourism industry.

In 2010, U.S. Chamber president Tom Donohue agreed to work with Senators John Kerry, Lindsey Graham, and Joe Lieberman as they crafted legislation to address climate change; the effort fell apart and failed to produce a bill. The climate campaign organization 350.org estimated that 94% of US Chamber of Commerce political contributions during the 2010 midterm elections went to candidates denying the scientific consensus on climate change.

In March 2017, before President Trump withdrew the US from the Paris Agreement, the Chamber funded a report that said the US commitments under the international agreement would significantly reduce industrial sector jobs.

In October 2017, Karen Harbert, CEO of the U.S. Chamber's Global Energy Institute, published an op-ed in USA Today criticizing the EPA's Clean Power Plan, saying, "The plan's fundamental flaw was that it would have intentionally raised the cost of energy without regard to the impact on families and businesses." Harbert added, "To be clear, the U.S. Chamber of Commerce believes that the climate is changing, and that man is contributing to these changes. We also believe that technology and innovation, rather than sweeping federal mandates, offer the best approach for reducing greenhouse gas emissions and mitigating the impacts of climate change."

In November 2019, the U.S. Chamber adopted the following policy addressing climate change: "The climate is changing and humans are contributing to these changes. We believe that there is much common ground on which all sides of this discussion could come together to address climate change with policies that are practical, flexible, predictable, and durable. We believe in a policy approach that acknowledges the costs of action and inaction and the competitiveness of the U.S. economy." They recommended that the US rejoin the Paris Agreement and summarized that an effective climate policy should:
 Leverage the power of business (rely primarily on private sector)
 Maintain U.S. leadership in climate science
 Embrace technology and innovation
 Aggressively pursue greater energy efficiency
 Promote climate resilient infrastructure
 Support trade in U.S. technologies and products
 Encourage international cooperation
In 2019, the organization said it had no position on a carbon tax.

On January 19, 2021, the day before President Trump's term ended, the Chamber said it wanted Congress to pass "durable climate policy" while also encouraging "a market-based approach" to reduce greenhouse gas emissions.

Immigration reform
The U.S. Chamber opposed President Donald Trump's executive order ending the Deferred Action for Childhood Arrivals program. The U.S. Chamber's Chief Policy Officer Neil Bradley said, "With approximately 700,000 DACA recipients working for all sorts of businesses across the country, terminating their employment eligibility runs contrary to the president's goal of growing the U.S. economy."

The Chamber of Commerce has come under attack by populist conservatives and others for its support of "amnesty" for illegal immigrants. In 2014, Tom Donohue stated the Chamber will "pull out all stops" for the passage of immigration reform in Congress. According to The Washington Post, Donohue did not offer specifics with regard to provisions or bills on the matter, speaking generally about the impact immigration would have on the U.S. economy.

OSHA COVID-19 Vaccination Emergency Temporary Standard
In early November 2021, the Biden Administration COVID-19 action plan set in motion OSHA's Emergency Temporary Standard (ETS) mandating COVID-19 vaccines or weekly testing for employees of companies with 100 or more employees. Numerous lawsuits were filed in several Federal appellate courts, and the Fifth Circuit granted a 30-day stay of the order. The U.S. Chamber did not file or join in any of the lawsuits, and in mid November Chamber vice president of employment policy Marc Freedman told CNBC that "employers still need to take this as a live ETS until it is definitively shut down... they should not bank on the preliminary actions of the 5th Circuit."

Lobbying expenditures
The Chamber has emerged as the largest lobbying organization in America. The Chamber's lobbying expenditures in 2018 were nearly 30 percent larger than those of the second-biggest spender, the National Association of Realtors at $72.8 million.

Organizational structure and membership

US Chamber Members, USPBC 2021

 Abbott
 AEAI
 Bayer
 Cargill
 Caterpillar, Inc.
 Citi
 The Coca-Cola Company
 Excelerate Energy L.P.
 ExxonMobil
 Facebook
 General Electric
 Gilead Sciences, Inc.
 Global Logistics Providers
 Google
 Hecate Energy
 Jamil & Jamil USA
 Netsol Technologies
 North Shore Medical Labs
 PepsiCo
 Pfizer
 PMI Global Services, Inc.
 Procter & Gamble
 S&P Global
 Target
 The Resource Group
 Uber
 Visionet Systems Inc

As of October 2010, the Chamber had a worldwide network of 115 American Chamber of Commerce affiliates located in 108 countries.  The US Chamber says that a relative handful of the Chamber's 300,000 members are "non-U.S.-based (foreign) companies."  It claims that, "No foreign money is used to fund political activities."  A US Chamber executive has said that the organization has had "foreign multinationals" (foreign companies) as members for  "over a century, many for decades." The US Chamber states that it receives approximately $100,000 annually in membership dues from its foreign affiliates, out of an annual budget of $200 million.

On its LINKEDIN Page the Chamber states: "The U.S. Chamber of Commerce is the world’s largest business organization representing the interests of more than three million businesses of every size, sector, and region." Likewise on its own Website it states: "For over 100 years, the U.S. Chamber of Commerce has represented the unified interests of the U.S. business community....the U.S. Chamber of Commerce is the world's largest business federation representing the interests of more than 3 million businesses of all sizes, sectors, and regions, as well as state and local chambers and industry associations."

Affiliate organizations 
 Americans for Transportation Mobility
 Center for Capital Markets Competitiveness
 Center for International Private Enterprise
 Global Energy Institute
 Institute for Legal Reform
 Institute for Organization Management (IOM)
 U.S. Chamber Litigation Center
 U.S. Chamber of Commerce Foundation (previously the National Chamber Foundation)

Global Innovation Policy Center
The Global Innovation Policy Center (formerly the Global Intellectual Property Center, and commonly known as GIPC) is the principal institution of the Chamber of Commerce handling all issues relating to innovation and creativity through advocating for strong intellectual property standards. It aims to:
 strengthen the protection and enforcement of IP rights in the United States and abroad,
 promote and defend the system of IP rights and norms in the United States, key countries, and multilateral forums,
 increase support for IP rights as a driver of innovation and creativity.

The Global Innovation Policy Center was launched in October 2007 at the U.S. Chamber’s 4th Annual Anti-Counterfeiting and Piracy Summit.  The GIPC was formed as an expansion of the existing efforts of the U.S. Chamber’s Global Anti-Counterfeiting and Piracy Initiative.

Leaders are, of have been:
 Thomas J. Donohue, President & CEO, U.S. Chamber of Commerce
 David Hirschmann, President & CEO, GIPC
 Patrick Kilbride, Senior Vice President, GIPC

Opposition
Several organizations have attacked the Chamber for its advocacy, including Chamber Watch (a campaign of Public Citizen). Advocates for independent business, like the American Independent Business Alliance (AMIBA) and green businesses, like the American Sustainable Business Council, have fought the Chamber on multiple issues. Among major divisions between the Chamber and these business advocates is allowing corporations to engage in electioneering. Oliver E. Diaz Jr. says one example of this was when the Chamber spent $1,000,000+ to fund negative campaign ads against him and have judicial candidate Keith Starrett elected instead.

Some in the business community have criticized the Chamber's approach to public issues as overly aggressive. Hilary Rosen, former CEO of the Recording Industry Association of America, added that "Their aggressive ways are out of step with a new generation of business leadership who are looking for more cooperative relationship with Washington."

See also

 Global Intellectual Property Center, US Chamber of Commerce institution
 National Federation of Independent Business
 U.S. Women's Chamber of Commerce
 United States Hispanic Chamber of Commerce
 Anthony D. Salzman

General:
 Advocacy group
 Lobbying in the United States

References

Further reading
 Davis, Cory, "The Political Economy of Commercial Associations: Building the National Board of Trade, 1840-1868," Business History Review, 88 (Winter 2014), 761–83. 
 Heald, Morrell. "Business thought in the twenties: Social responsibility." American Quarterly (1961): 126–139. in JSTOR
 Lesher, Richard and Dave Scheiber. Voice of Business: The Man Who Transformed the United States Chamber of Commerce (2017), Richard Lesher was president of the US Chamber of Commerce from 1975 to 1997.
 Werking, Richard Hume. "Bureaucrats, businessmen, and foreign trade: the origins of the United States Chamber of Commerce." Business History Review 52#03 (1978) pp: 321–341.

External links

 
 Global IP Center
 Real Clear Politics Portal
 Guide to Chamber of Commerce of the United States of America. Publications. 5332. Kheel Center for Labor-Management Documentation and Archives, Martin P. Catherwood Library, Cornell University.
 Chamber of Commerce of the United States of America. Communications Development Division. Videotape collection, 1988-1992. Schlesinger Library, Radcliffe Institute, Harvard University.

 
Organizations established in 1912
1912 establishments in Washington, D.C.
Political advocacy groups in the United States
Business organizations based in the United States
Conservative organizations in the United States
Immigration political advocacy groups in the United States
Lobbying organizations based in Washington, D.C.
501(c)(6) nonprofit organizations
Climate change denial